Richard Kelly (21 March 1870 – 27 December 1941) was an Australian cricketer. He played one first-class cricket match for Victoria in 1897.

See also
 List of Victoria first-class cricketers

References

External links
 

1870 births
1941 deaths
Australian cricketers
Victoria cricketers
Cricketers from Melbourne